Cesonia elegans is a spider species in the genus of Cesonia found on St. Vincent, Dominica.

References

Gnaphosidae
Fauna of Saint Vincent and the Grenadines
Spiders of the Caribbean
Spiders described in 1891